The 2012–13 Austrian Cup was the 79th season of Austria's nationwide football cup competition. It commenced with the matches of the First Round on 12 July 2012 and concluded with the Final on 30 May 2013. This year the tournament took place with only 64 participants, which abolishes the preliminary rounds. This year reserve teams were not allowed to participate in the competition.

Participating teams
The teams of the Bundesliga and the First League, the two losers of the First League Relegation Playoff and the winner of the 9 winner of the province cups. Also there were lower league teams, nominated by the 9 province-FAs.

Schedule
 First Round: 13–15 July 2012
 Second Round: 25–26 September 2012
 Thhird Round: 30–31 October 2012
 Quarterfinals: 16–17 April 2013
 Semifinals: 7–8 May 2013
 Final: 30 May 2013

First round
The draw for this round was on 1 July 2012. The matches took place from 13 to 15 July 2012.

|-
|colspan="3" style="background-color:#fcc;"|

|-
|colspan="3" style="background-color:#fcc;"|

|-
|colspan="3" style="background-color:#fcc;"|

|-
|colspan="3" style="background-color:#fcc;"|

|}

Second round
The draw for this round was on 13 August 2012. The matches took place on 25 and 26 September 2012.

|-
|colspan="3" style="background-color:#fcc;"|

|-
|colspan="3" style="background-color:#fcc;"|

|}

Third round
The draw for this round was on 2 October 2012. The matches took place on 30 and 31 October 2012.

|-
|colspan="3" style="background-color:#fcc;"|

|-
|colspan="3" style="background-color:#fcc;"|

|}

Quarter-finals
The matches took place on 16 and 17 April 2013.

Semi-finals
The matches took place on 7 and 8 May 2013.

Final

References

External links

 

Austrian Cup seasons
Cup
Austrian Cup